The Great Dolmen of Comenda da Igreja (or alternately Anta Grande da Herdade da Igreja) is a megalithic funerary site in the civil parish of Nossa Senhora do Bispo, in the municipality of Montemor-o-Novo, in the central Alentejo region of continental Portugal.

History
Between the 4th millennium BC and the middle of the 3rd millennium BC, the site of was occupied by semi-nomadic or sedentary settlement, associated with the communities of ancient Évora.

Architecture
The megalithic site, is located in an isolated area of forested brush, situated in an area of plains.

The articulated volumes are oriented horizontally, and covered independently in each section, with the main chamber covered by a granite slab, and the corridor by individual elements. Of great dimensions, the corridor is still intact and in a state of conservation.

References
Notes

Sources

External links 
 Anta grande da Comenda da Igreja – Patrimonio Cultural

Dolmens in Portugal
National monuments in Évora District
Buildings and structures in Évora District